Mary Young, Marie Young or Maria Young may refer to:

Musicians
Mary Jane Young (born 1937, member of Mary Jane and Winston Young), Canadian folksinger
Polly Young (1749–1799), also known as Mary Young and Maria Young, English classical soprano

Others
Mary Young (politician), member of the Colorado House of Representatives
Mary Young Pickersgill (1776–1857, born Mary Young), American flagmaker
Mary Ann Angell (1808–1882, full name Mary Ann Angell Young), American religious figure
Maria Young Dougall (1849–1935, born Mary Young), American suffragist
Mary Young (actress) (1879–1971), stage and film actress
Mary Bird (skier) (1910–2002, full name Mary Elizabeth Bird Young), American alpine skier
Mary de Young (born 1950), American sociologist
Mary Rose Young (born 1958), English ceramic artist
Sean Young (born 1959), actress born as Mary Sean Young in 1959
Marie Grice Young (1876–1959), survivor of the Titanic sinking
Mary Helen Young (1883–1945), Scottish nurse and resistance fighter
Mary Sophie Young (1870s–1919), botanist at the University of Texas
Jenny Diver, née Mary Young, a notorious British pickpocket

Characters
Mary Alice Young, fictional character in ABC TV series Desperate Housewives

See also
Mary S. Young State Recreation Area, park in Oregon, USA